Peyritschiella is a genus of fungi in the family Laboulbeniaceae. The genus contain 47 species.

The genus name of Peyritschiella is in honour of Johann Joseph Peyritsch (1835–1889), who was an Austrian physician and botanist born in Völkermarkt. 

The genus was circumscribed by Roland Thaxter in Proc. Amer. Acad. Arts Sci. vol.25 on page 8 in 1890.

Species
As accepted by Species Fungorum;

Peyritschiella amazonica 
Peyritschiella angolensis 
Peyritschiella anisopleura 
Peyritschiella argentinensis 
Peyritschiella arimensis 
Peyritschiella australiensis 
Peyritschiella belonuchi 
Peyritschiella bicolor 
Peyritschiella bifida 
Peyritschiella biformis 
Peyritschiella cafiana 
Peyritschiella chilensis 
Peyritschiella clivinae 
Peyritschiella curvata 
Peyritschiella dubia 
Peyritschiella eulissi 
Peyritschiella exilis 
Peyritschiella formosana 
Peyritschiella fumosa 
Peyritschiella furcifera 
Peyritschiella geminata 
Peyritschiella gracilis 
Peyritschiella heinemanniana 
Peyritschiella homalotae 
Peyritschiella hybrida 
Peyritschiella infecta 
Peyritschiella insignis 
Peyritschiella japonica 
Peyritschiella javana 
Peyritschiella lampropygi 
Peyritschiella lepida 
Peyritschiella madagascariensis 
Peyritschiella mexicana 
Peyritschiella minima 
Peyritschiella nigrescens 
Peyritschiella okumae 
Peyritschiella oxyteli 
Peyritschiella pallida 
Peyritschiella peruviana 
Peyritschiella pretiosa 
Peyritschiella princeps 
Peyritschiella protea 
Peyritschiella quedii 
Peyritschiella staphylini 
Peyritschiella subinaequilatera 
Peyritschiella thyreocephali 
Peyritschiella trichodomiae 
Peyritschiella vulgata 
Peyritschiella xanthopygi 
Peyritschiella xyricola

References

External links

Laboulbeniomycetes